In mathematics, Cartan formula can mean:

See interior product for the detail. It is also called the Cartan homotopy formula or Cartan magic formula. This formula is named after Élie Cartan.

 one in algebraic topology, which is one of the five axioms of Steenrod algebra. It reads:

. 

See Steenrod algebra for the detail. The name derives from Henri Cartan, son of Élie.

Footnotes

See also 
 List of things named after Élie Cartan